The Dayne Ogilvie Prize for LGBTQ Emerging Writers is a Canadian literary award, presented annually by the Writers' Trust of Canada to an emerging Canadian writer who is part of the lesbian, gay, bisexual, transgender, or queer community. Originally presented as a general career achievement award for emerging writers that considered their overall body of work, since 2022 it has been presented to honor debut books.

It is one of two literary awards in Canada serving the LGBTQ community, alongside the Blue Metropolis Violet Prize for established writers.

The award was originally established by artist Robin Pacific as the Dayne Ogilvie Grant in memory of Dayne Ogilvie, a book editor, writer, arts manager and former managing editor of Xtra! who died in October 2006. The award was renamed from a grant to a prize in 2012.

Established in 2007, the  prize was not originally presented for a specific work, although writers must have published at least one book of fiction or poetry to be eligible. The winner was selected by an independent jury of three members, and presented annually; the presentation was normally in June, although the 2020 announcement was postponed to October due to the COVID-19 pandemic in Canada. In its early years the award was presented in conjunction with Pride Toronto, although in later years it expanded to different venues and cities.

Beginning in the prize's second year, the award introduced a preliminary shortlist of two or three writers. The writer or writers not selected as the final winner of the prize are presented with an Honour of Distinction, worth  if one writer is named or  each if two writers are named. Authors who are awarded the Honour of Distinction remain eligible for the primary award in future years, although to date no writer who has been awarded an Honour of Distinction has subsequently been named the primary winner. In 2019, Casey Plett became the first Honour of Distinction recipient in the award's history to be renominated. 

The Writers' Trust has announced that beginning with the 2022 award, the prize will transition from a general "career achievement" award into a prize to honour specific debut books. The award's scheduling has also been moved so that it no longer takes place in June as part of Pride Month, but in November at the same gala presentation as the other Writers' Trust awards.

Winners and nominees

References

External links

Dayne Ogilvie Prize

2007 establishments in Canada
Awards established in 2007
Canadian literary awards
LGBT literary awards
LGBT literature in Canada
Writers' Trust of Canada awards